State Road 552 (SR 552), signed east–west, is part of Curry Ford Road in eastern Orlando.

Route description

SR 552's western terminus is at SR 15 in Orlando and its eastern terminus is at SR 551 near Azalea Park.

History
SR 552 was originally SR 526A; it was renumbered in the mid-1980s.

SR 526A at one time stretched west to Briercliff Drive; this had been part of SR 15 even earlier.

Curry Ford Road east of Goldenrod Road was once part of SR 425, but was probably never part of SR 526A.

Major intersections

References

External links

552
552
552